Hammou Boutayeb (born 1956 in Khemisset) is a Moroccan former long-distance runner. He specialized in the 10,000 metres.

Boutayeb won a silver medal at the World Indoor Championships held in Seville, Spain.

However, Boutayeb may be best known for a controversy in the 1992 Olympic Games in Barcelona. In the 1992 Olympics 10,000 Meter Final, Boutayeb was lapped with 3 laps to go in the race and proceeded to run along the lead pack of Richard Chelimo and Khalid Skah, distracting Chelimo and thus causing him to lose rhythm and give the lead up to Skah, instead of giving way to them as dictated by the rules. Skah bested Chelimo by 1.02 seconds, but was temporarily disqualified for allegedly receiving assistance from Boutayeb. However, Skah appealed and was later reinstated.

International competitions

References

External links

1956 births
Living people
People from Khemisset
Moroccan male long-distance runners
Olympic athletes of Morocco
Athletes (track and field) at the 1992 Summer Olympics
World Athletics Championships athletes for Morocco
Goodwill Games medalists in athletics
Mediterranean Games gold medalists for Morocco
Mediterranean Games silver medalists for Morocco
Mediterranean Games medalists in athletics
Athletes (track and field) at the 1991 Mediterranean Games
Athletes (track and field) at the 1993 Mediterranean Games
Competitors at the 1990 Goodwill Games
Competitors at the 1994 Goodwill Games
20th-century Moroccan people
21st-century Moroccan people